Meidericher Spielverein 02 e. V. Duisburg, commonly known as MSV Duisburg, is a German women's football club based in Duisburg, North Rhine-Westphalia. The club plays in the Bundesliga, the top tier of German women's football.

History
The women's football section of MSV Duisburg was founded in 2014. It is the successor club of FCR 2001 Duisburg which went into insolvency the year before. They played in the second level 2. Bundesliga (women) in 2015–16 where a league championship took the club back to the 1st Division Bundesliga.

When FCR 2001 Duisburg had to file for insolvency during the 2013–14 season, nearly all players left the club and joined the MSV Duisburg. As MSV they were allowed to continue the second half of the season with the original license of the FCR.

After 2016-17 through 2020-21 repeated Promotion & Relegation, as of May 2022 MSV Duisburg has once again earned Promotion to the Frauen Bundesliga for the 2022-23 Season.

Current squad

Former players

References

External links

Women's football clubs in Germany
Football clubs in North Rhine-Westphalia
Women
2014 establishments in Germany
Association football clubs established in 2014
Frauen-Bundesliga clubs